František Ondříček (29 April 1857 – 12 April 1922) was a Czech violinist and composer.  He gave the first performance of the Violin Concerto by Antonín Dvořák, and his achievements were recognised by the rare award of honorary membership of the Philharmonic Society of London (now the Royal Philharmonic Society) in 1891.

His younger brother Karel Ondříček (b. 1865) for a while lead the orchestra of the National Theatre, Prague, and was to go on to have a successful musical career in the USA.

František Ondříček was born in Prague, the son of the violinist and conductor Jan Ondříček.  He studied at the Prague Conservatory under Antonín Bennewitz, and was then supported by Henryk Wieniawski through two years studying at the Paris Conservatoire with Lambert Massart.  He shared a first prize with Achille Rivarde.

He was the soloist in the first performance of Dvořák's Violin Concerto, Op. 53 in Prague on 14 October 1883, and performed it again in Vienna on 2 December.  In the late 1880s he settled in Vienna, where he taught.  He also published a technical treatise on violin technique in 1909.

After World War I, Ondříček returned to Prague, where he directed the violin masterclass at the Prague Conservatory.  Notable students include composer Karel Navrátil.  He died in Milan.

As well as being a highly regarded violinist, Ondříček was also a composer, his works including a set of Bohemian Dances Op. 3 for violin and piano composed in 1883, a Bohemian Rhapsody Op. 21 for violin and piano from 1906, and a String Quartet Op. 22 from 1907.  He also left cadenzas for several violin concertos, including those of Mozart and Brahms.

Selected works 
Chamber music
 String Quartet in A major, Op. 22 (1905-1907)
 Romance in A major for cello and piano, Op. 2

Violin and piano
 Ballade in A major, Op. 1 (1877)
 Danses bohèmes (Bohemian Dances), Op. 3 (1883, published 1891)
 Fantasie on Motifs from the Opera "The Bartered Bride" by Bedřich Smetana, Op. 9 (1888)
 Barcarole in G major, Op. 10 (1890)
 Romance in D major, Op. 12 (1891)
 A la Canzona, Morceau de Concert, Op. 13 (1894)
 Vzpomínání (Sorrowful Rêverie), Op. 14 (published 1895); transcription of No. 6 from Antonín Dvořák's Poetické nálady, Op. 85
 Skočná, Czech Dance from the Opera The Bartered Bride by Bedřich Smetana, Op. 15 (published 1895)
 Fantasie on Motifs from the Opera "A Life for the Tsar" by Mikhail Glinka, Op. 16 (1889)
 Nocturno, Op. 17 (1900)
 Scherzo capriccioso in D minor, Op. 18 (1901)
 Rhapsodie bohème in E minor, Op. 21 (1906)
 Valse triste (1913)
 Ukolébavka (Lullaby) (1913)
 Idylka (published 1956); transcription of piano composition (Op. 7, No. 4, II) by Josef Suk
 Koncertní etuda (Concert Etude) in D major
 Koncertní etuda (Concert Etude) in E major

Piano
 Dumka (Elegie) (published 1907)

Pedagogical works
 Patnáct uměleckých etud (15 Artistic Etudes) for violin solo, or violin and piano (published 1912)
 Tägliche Übungen (Daily Exercises) for the Violinist (published 1909)
 Elementarschule des Violinspiels (Elementary School for the Violinist) (published 1910)
 Mittelstufe des Violinspiels (Intermediate School for the Violinist) (published 1909)
 Neue Methode zur Erlangung der Meistertechnik des Violinspiels (New Method for Acquiring the Master Technique of Violin Playing) (published 1909)

References

External links 

 

1857 births
1922 deaths
Czech classical composers
Czech male classical composers
Czech classical violinists
Male classical violinists
Honorary Members of the Royal Philharmonic Society
Musicians from Prague